A Hanukkah menorah, or hanukkiah, is a nine-branched candelabrum lit during the eight-day Jewish holiday of Hanukkah. Eight of the nine branches hold lights (candles or oil lamps) that symbolize the eight nights of the holiday; on each night, one more light is lit than the previous night, until on the final night all eight branches are ignited. The ninth branch holds a candle, called the shamash ("helper" or "servant"), which is used to light the other eight.

The Hanukkah menorah commemorates, but is distinct from, the seven-branched menorah used in the ancient Temple in Jerusalem. Along with the seven-branched menorah and the Star of David, it is among the most widely produced articles of Jewish ceremonial art.

Construction
To be kosher, the shamash must be offset on a higher or lower plane than the main eight candles or oil lamps, but there are differing opinions as to whether all the lights must be arranged in a straight line, or if the hanukkiah can be arranged in a curve.

Public displays

The hanukkiah is often displayed in public around Hanukkah time in December. Elected officials often participate in publicly lighting the hanukkiah. The Chabad-Lubavitch movement is well associated with public lighting ceremonies, which it has done since a directive from their last Rebbe, Menachem Mendel Schneerson, in 1987. In the book A Kosher Christmas: 'Tis the Season to Be Jewish, author Rabbi Joshua Plaut, Ph.D., details the history of public displays of the hanukkiah across the United States, summarizes the court cases associated with this issue, and explains how Presidents of the United States came to embrace lighting the hanukkiah during Hanukkah.

In the US, the White House has been represented at the lighting of the National Menorah since 1979. This celebration of Hanukkah began with the attendance of President Jimmy Carter in the ceremony in Lafayette Park. Additionally, beginning with President Bill Clinton in 1993, a hanukkiah is lit at the White House, and in 2001, President George W. Bush began the annual tradition of a White House Hanukkah Party in the White House residence, which includes a hanukkiah candle lighting ceremony.

In the United Kingdom, the House of Commons holds a yearly hanukkiah lighting at the official residence of the Speaker of the House of Commons in the Palace of Westminster. Although John Bercow became the first Jewish Speaker of the House in 2009, the hanukkiah currently used every year had actually been commissioned in 2003 by his predecessor Michael Martin, who was a Catholic; prior to this, a hannukiah had to be borrowed for the ceremony every year.

Two large hanukkiahs are in New York City, each standing at 32 feet. One is at Grand Army Plaza in Brooklyn, and the other is at Fifth Avenue and 59th Street in Manhattan near Central Park. A  structure, it is the work of Israeli artist Yaacov Agam. Because of the hanukkiah's height, Con Edison assists the lighting by using a crane to lift each person to the top.

In the United States, the public display of hanukkiahs and Christmas trees on public grounds has been the source of legal battles. Specifically, in the 1989 County of Allegheny v. ACLU case, the majority of the U.S. Supreme Court ruled that the public display of hanukkiahs and Christmas trees did not violate the Establishment Clause because the two symbols were not endorsements of the Jewish or Christian faith, and were rather part of the same winter holiday season, which the court found had attained a secular status in US society.

Name
English speakers most commonly call the lamp a "menorah" or "Hanukkah menorah" (the Hebrew word menorah simply meaning "lamp"). In Modern Hebrew, the lamp is generally called a chanukkiyah, a term which originated among Judeo-Spanish speaking Sephardic communities in the Eastern Mediterranean in the 18th century. It was introduced into Modern Hebrew by Hemda Ben-Yehuda, whose husband Eliezer Ben Yehuda was the leading force behind the revival of the Hebrew language in the late 19th century.

Public collections
Many museums have notable collections of hanukkiahs, including the Israel Museum in Jerusalem, the Metropolitan Museum of Art in New York City, and the Jewish Museum in London (which owns the Lindo lamp).

There is a collection in the small Jewish Museum in Rio de Janeiro.

Adaptations 
More offbeat Hanukkah products on the American market include a "Menorah Tree" inspired by the Christmas tree tradition, and even a "Menorah Bong". The "Thanksgivukkah" coincidence of Thanksgiving and the second night of Hanukkah in 2013 inspired a turkey-shaped "menurkey".

On December 10, 1997, the Internet first widely celebrated Interactive Menorah was the premiere greeting for the New York Times Cyberseason’s Greetings section of their website. This Internet heirloom Menorah allowed users to celebrate the holiday from anywhere, lighting candles with a mouse click. Users could enjoy the digital Menorah in a small window or full screen. Today the Interactive Menorah can be displayed via Augmented Reality or Billboard size.[clarify] The utility of the historic Menorah was a key element in delivery of the digital Menorah. New York Times Achieve Display Page

The Menorah holding a two-day supply of oil managed to last eight days allowing rabbi to cleanse the Roman influence from Jerusalem’s second temple. This utility was honored as the digital Menorah used a miniscule file size of 19kb. The digital Menorah was created by recognized digital artist Bruce Keffer, using the then-new Flash animation software.[10]

Gallery

Notes

References

External links

Yearly lighting of the Menorah at the White House
Hanukkah Lamps from the collection of The Jewish Museum (New York)

Jewish ritual objects
Hanukkah
Candelabra
Hebrew words and phrases in Jewish law
Fire in religion